The Embassy of the Netherlands in Washington, D.C., is the  Kingdom of the Netherlands' diplomatic mission to the United States, located at 4200 Linnean Avenue, N.W., Washington, D.C.

The Netherlands operates  Consulates-General in Atlanta, Chicago, Miami, New York and San Francisco. 

The Dutch Ambassador to the United States is André Haspels. The Ambassador's residence is located at 2347 S Street, N.W. Washington, D.C.

References

External links
United States | Netherlands and You 
Netherlands Ambassador Residence

Netherlands
Washington, D.C.
Forest Hills (Washington, D.C.)
Netherlands–United States relations